Perepeczko is a Polish surname. It may refer to:

 Agnieszka Perepeczko (born 1942), Polish actress
 Andrzej Perepeczko, Polish Naval officer, writer and publicist
 Marek Perepeczko (1942–2005), Polish movie and theatre actor

References 

Polish-language surnames